Dermatobranchus is a genus of sea slugs, or nudibranchs, marine gastropod molluscs in the family Arminidae.

Biology 
Dermatobranchus species feed on octocorals including sea fans and sea pens.

Species 
Species within the genus Dermatobranchus include:

 Dermatobranchus albineus Gosliner & Fahey, 2011
 Dermatobranchus albopunctulatus Baba, 1949
 Dermatobranchus albus (Eliot, 1904)
 Dermatobranchus arminus Gosliner & Fahey, 2011
 Dermatobranchus caeruleomaculatus Gosliner & Fahey, 2011
 Dermatobranchus caesitius Gosliner & Fahey, 2011
 Dermatobranchus cymatilis Gosliner & Fahey, 2011
 Dermatobranchus dendronephthyphagus Gosliner & Fahey, 2011
 Dermatobranchus diagonalis Gosliner & Fahey, 2011
 Dermatobranchus earlei Gosliner & Fahey, 2011
 Dermatobranchus fasciatus Gosliner & Fahey, 2011
 Dermatobranchus fortunatus (Bergh, 1888)
 Dermatobranchus funiculus Gosliner & Fahey, 2011
 Dermatobranchus glaber (Eliot, 1908)
 Dermatobranchus gonatophorus van Hasselt, 1824
 Dermatobranchus kalyptos Gosliner & Fahey, 2011
 Dermatobranchus kokonas Gosliner & Fahey, 2011
 Dermatobranchus leoni Gosliner & Fahey, 2011
 Dermatobranchus marginlatus Lin, 1981
 Dermatobranchus microphallus Gosliner & Fahey, 2011
 Dermatobranchus multidentatus Baba, 1949
 Dermatobranchus multistriatus Lin, 1981
 Dermatobranchus nigropunctatus Baba, 1949
 Dermatobranchus oculus Gosliner & Fahey, 2011
 Dermatobranchus ornatus (Bergh, 1874)
 Dermatobranchus otome Baba, 1992
 Dermatobranchus phyllodes Gosliner & Fahey, 2011
 Dermatobranchus piperoides Gosliner & Fahey, 2011
 Dermatobranchus primus Baba, 1976
 Dermatobranchus pustulosus van Hasselt, 1824
 Dermatobranchus rodmani Gosliner & Fahey, 2011
 Dermatobranchus rubidus (Gould, 1852)
 Dermatobranchus sagamianus Baba, 1949
 Dermatobranchus semilunus Gosliner & Fahey, 2011
 Dermatobranchus semistriatus Baba, 1949
 Dermatobranchus sp. 1 white-ridged nudibranch
 Dermatobranchus sp. 4 brown ridged nudibranch
 Dermatobranchus striatellus Baba, 1949
 Dermatobranchus striatus van Hasselt, 1824
 Dermatobranchus substriatus Baba, 1949
 Dermatobranchus tongshanensis Lin, 1981
 Dermatobranchus tuberculatus Gosliner & Fahey, 2011

Species brought into synonymy
 Dermatobranchus pulcherrimus Miller & Willan, 1986: synonym of Dermatobranchus rubidus (Gould, 1852)
 Dermatobranchus walteri (Krause, 1892): synonym of Doridoxa walteri (Krause, 1892)

References

Arminidae